Glimt may refer to:

FK Bodø/Glimt, a football club from Bodø, Norway
FK Sørøy Glimt, a football club from Hasvik, Finnmark, Norway
HNoMS Glimt (P962), a vessel built for the Royal Norwegian Navy